Mhairi or Mhàiri is a Scottish female given name, ultimately derived from the name Mary. Etymologically, it is an erroneous form, based on the Scottish Gaelic vocative form a Mhàiri (pronounced ), from the nominative Màiri . In Scottish English it is usually pronounced , though it can be pronounced mari. Variations of this form also occur, such as Mhari or Mhairie.

Notable people with this name
 Mhairi-Louise Hickey, singer and songwriter
 Mhairi McKay, Scottish golfer
 Mhairi Spence, modern pentathlete
 Mhairi Black, MP for Paisley and Renfrewshire South
 Mairi Hedderwick, author
 Mhairi McFarlane, novelist

See also
 Mairi (disambiguation)

External links

Scottish feminine given names